The 2014 UEFA Super Cup was the 39th edition of the UEFA Super Cup, an annual football match organised by UEFA and contested by the reigning champions of the two main European club competitions, the UEFA Champions League and the UEFA Europa League. The match featured two Spanish teams Real Madrid and Sevilla, the winners of the 2013–14 UEFA Champions League and the 2013–14 UEFA Europa League respectively. It was played at the Cardiff City Stadium in Cardiff, Wales, on 12 August 2014. The date was moved from Friday in late August in previous years, to mid-August starting this year, following the removal of the August international friendly date in the new FIFA International Match Calendar.

Real Madrid won 2–0 to win their second UEFA Super Cup, with both goals by Cristiano Ronaldo.

Venue

The Cardiff City Stadium was announced as the venue of the Super Cup at the UEFA Executive Committee meeting on 30 June 2012. This was the first UEFA Super Cup hosted in Wales.

The Cardiff City Stadium opened in July 2009 on the site of the Cardiff Athletics Stadium. It is the home stadium of Cardiff City. The stadium had a capacity of 33,000 after expansion work.

Teams

Pre-match

Ticketing
The international ticket sales phase for the general public ran from 5 to 27 June 2014. Tickets were available in three price categories: £110, £75, and £40.

Officials
England's Mark Clattenburg was appointed by UEFA as the referee of the match, accompanied by an all-English team of officials: assistant referees Simon Beck and Stuart Burt, fourth official Darren England, and additional assistant referees Michael Oliver and Anthony Taylor.

The match was the first in a UEFA club competition to use vanishing spray.

Match

Team selection
Real Madrid midfielder Xabi Alonso was suspended for the match, due to breaches of conduct in the Champions League Final, for which he was also suspended.

New signings Toni Kroos and James Rodríguez made their competitive debuts for Real Madrid; another new signing, Keylor Navas, was an unused substitute. Sevilla gave competitive debuts to Denis Suárez, Aleix Vidal and Grzegorz Krychowiak, as well as substitute Iago Aspas. Nicolás Pareja and Daniel Carriço represented Sevilla for the first time since their loans were made permanent.

Details

Statistics

See also
2016 UEFA Super Cup – contested between same teams
Real Madrid CF in international football competitions
Sevilla FC in European football
Spanish football clubs in international competitions

References

External links

2014 UEFA Super Cup, UEFA.com

2014
2014–15 in UEFA football
Uefa Super Cup
Sports competitions in Cardiff
International club association football competitions hosted by Wales
Uefa Super Cup 2014
Uefa Super Cup 2014
Uefa Super Cup
2010s in Cardiff
August 2014 sports events in the United Kingdom